Ilić is a surname derived from the South Slavic masculine given name Ilija (itself derived from biblical Elijah) and found across the former SFRJ. It is seventh most frequent surname in Serbia. Notable people with the surname include:

Marija D. Ilić (born 1951), American electrical engineer
Dan Ilic (born 1981), Australian TV presenter, comedian, film maker
Milica Ilić (born 1981), Australian classical guitarist
Grgo Ilić (1736 – 1813), Bosnian Franciscan and a bishop
Danilo Ilić (1891–1915), Bosnian journalist and co-conspirator in the assassination of the Archduke Franz Ferdinand of Austria
Vladimir Ilić (born 1982), Montenegrin footballer
Branko Ilić (born 1983), Slovenian footballer
Brana Ilić (born 1985), Serbian footballer
Bogdan Ilić (born 1996), Serbian YouTuber, rapper, gamer and entertainer
Dejan Ilić (born 1976), Serbian footballer
Jovan Ilić (1824–1901), Serbian poet, father of Vojislav Ilić
Marija Ilić, Serbian footballer
Marko Ilić (footballer, born 1985), Serbian football midfielder
Marko Ilić (footballer, born 1998), Serbian football goalkeeper
Milovan Ilić Minimaks (1938–2005), Serbian radio and TV journalist
Mile Ilić (born 1984), Serbian basketball player
Miroslav Ilić (born 1950), Serbian singer-songwriter
Petar Ilić (born 1993), Serbian footballer
Radiša Ilić (born 1977), Serbian football goalkeeper
Stefan Ilić (born 1995), Serbian footballer
Tatjana Ilić (born 1966), Serbian artist
Teodor Ilić Češljar (1746–1793), Serbian painter
Velimir Ilić (born 1951), Serbian politician
Vojislav Ilić (1862–1894), Serbian poet, son of Jovan Ilić
Mirko Ilić (born 1956), Yugoslavian graphic designer based in New York
Vanja Ilić (swimmer) (born 1927), Yugoslavian Olympic swimmer
Aleksandar Ilić (disambiguation), several people
Ivan Ilić (disambiguation), several people
Saša Ilić (disambiguation), several people

See also
Illich

References  

Croatian surnames
Serbian surnames
Patronymic surnames
Montenegrin surnames
Bosnian surnames

de:Ilić
fr:Ilić
ja:イリッチ